20,000 Leagues Under the Sea（海底2万マイル） is an attraction at Tokyo DisneySea, based on Jules Verne's novel "Twenty Thousand Leagues Under the Sea" and Disney's 1954 film "20,000 Leagues Under the Sea".

Story
Guests board a small submarine developed by Captain Nemo and participate in a tour to explore the world under the sea. This submarine was remotely controlled from the control base where Captain Nemo was, and it should have been secured by that. However, when he tried to make the submarine levitate, the submarine was attacked by the Kraken and lost control, resulting in a detour into an unknown world.

The place where the guests end up was a world of Atlantis where mermen live. They had evolved their own in a place close to the center of the earth. The submarine was boosted by the mysterious power of the mermen, and was able to return to the base safely.

Ride
This attraction's concept is similar to Disneyland's Submarine Voyage and Magic Kingdom's distinguished attraction 20,000 Leagues Under the Sea: Submarine Voyage.  This ride does not go through real water; several effect including bubbles in the window or the movements are added.

References

External links
 

Walt Disney Parks and Resorts attractions
Tokyo DisneySea
Mysterious Island (Tokyo DisneySea)
Amusement rides introduced in 2001
2001 establishments in Japan
Works based on Twenty Thousand Leagues Under the Sea
Amusement rides based on works by Jules Verne